The Rugby Europe Women's Championship is an international competition contested between women's national teams who are members of Rugby Europe (known from 1999 to 2014 as FIRA - Association of European Rugby, and FIRA before that). The competition has its origins in a four nation "European Cup" held in 1988 but did not become an official FIRA competition until 1995. The competition has grown significantly and is some years attracts sufficient entrants for it to be divided into two "Pools" (A and B) with the eight highest ranked entrants in any year (based on Rugby Europe rankings) in Pool A.

Since 2000 only the winner of the tournament held in between the World Cups (every four years, as highlighted) is officially recognised "European Champions", although teams winning tournaments in other years are often unofficially also described as "European Champions". This can cause some confusion, not least because the structure of the four-yearly tournament is invariably identical to the annual event. To make identification easier the competitions in the four yearly cycle are highlighted.

The only major difference between the "official" European Championships and other tournaments is that in the latter, between 2001 and 2007, England and France tended not to send their full strength national squads to the competition - though until 2007 they still played as "England" or "France". This has resulted in some confusion about the status of games played by these nations - England do not consider their games to be full internationals (or "tests") and do not award caps, whereas while France also do not give caps to their players in such matches, they do recognise the games as tests matches. FIRA and all other competing nations consider all the games to be "tests".

The 2009 tournament acted as Europe's qualification tournament for the World Cup (all entrants sending full strength squads), after which the test match status problem was finally resolved. From 2010 onwards it was announced  that the non-Championship tournaments would be known as the "European Trophy" and any Six Nations entrants would officially be "A" sides (though in 2010 Italy, as they had not qualified for the 2010 World Cup, entered their full strength squad).

Championship tournament

Performance of nations

All tournaments

Official FIRA tournaments
  - 4 titles, 3 runners-up, 1 third, 3 fourths
  - 4 titles, 1 runner-up, 2 thirds, 1 fourth
  - 3 titles, 5 runners-up, 3 thirds
  - 3 titles, 1 runner-up, 2 thirds, 2 fourth
  - 2 titles, 1 runner-up, 2 thirds, 1 fourth
  - 1 title, 1 runner-up, 2 thirds, 2 fourth
  - 2 runners-up, 2 third, 4 fourths
  - 1 runner-up, 1 fourth
  - 1 third, 1 fourth
  - 1 third
  - 1 third

"European Championships"
  - 5 titles, 1 runner-up, 2 fourths
  - 2 titles, 1 runner-up, 1 third, 1 fourth
  - 1 title, 3 runners-up, 1 third
  - 1 runner-up, 2 thirds, 1 fourth
  - 1 runner-up, 1 fourth
  - 1 runner-up
  - 2 thirds
  - 1 third, 2 fourths
  - 1 third

Trophy tournament

Performance of nations
  - 4 titles, 3 runners-up
  - 3 titles, 1 runner-up
  - 2 titles, 3 third
  - 1 title, 2 runners-up, 2 fourths
  - 1 title, 1 runners-up, 1 fourth
  French Flanders - 1 title
  French Universities - 1 title
  - 2 runners-up, 4 thirds
  - 2 runners-up, 1 third, 1 fourth
  - 1 runner-up, 3 thirds
  French Defence - 1 runner-up
  - 1 third, 2 fourth
  - 1 third
  - 2 fourths
  - 1 fourth

See also
Women's international rugby

References

External links
Rugby Europe website

 
Women's rugby union competitions in Europe for national teams
Rugby
Women's